The Cape Hope Islands are an uninhabited Canadian arctic islands group located within the midsection of James Bay in Nunavut, Canada. They are situated south of Vieux-Comptoir (Old Factory).

History
The Inuit who lived on the Cape Hope Islands in the 1930s were transferred by the government to Great Whale River in 1960. They now live in Kuujjuarapik, Quebec, and there is no longer a permanent settlement on the Cape Hope Islands.

Notable people
 Mini Aodla Freeman, publisher, author, producer, was born on the Cape Hope Islands.

References

Uninhabited islands of Qikiqtaaluk Region
Islands of James Bay
Archipelagoes of the Canadian Arctic Archipelago